Party Time is the third studio album by the Japanese pop music duo ClariS, released on June 4, 2014, by SME Records. The album contains 12 music tracks, three of which were previously released on three of ClariS' singles. Three different editions of the album were released: a regular CD version and two limited editions. Party Time was the last time Clara and Alice performed as ClariS, with Alice leaving the duo. Party Time peaked at No. 2 on the Japanese Oricon weekly albums chart.

Three of the songs were used as theme songs for anime: "Click" and "Step" were used as the opening theme songs to the 2014 anime television series Nisekoi and "Colorful" was the opening theme to the film Puella Magi Madoka Magica: Rebellion.

Release and reception
Party Time was released on June 4, 2014, in three editions: a regular CD version and two limited editions. One of the limited edition versions was bundled with two Nendoroid figures of ClariS. The other limited edition version came with a DVD containing music videos of the songs "Click", "Step" and "Colorful", as well as non-credit opening videos for "Colorful", "Click" and "Reunion", and a collection of television commercials for each of ClariS' singles. For the week of June 2, 2014 on Oricon's weekly albums chart, Party Time was reported to have sold 43,146 copies in its first week of sales, peaking at No. 2, and charted for 12 weeks.

Track listing

Personnel

ClariS
Clara – vocals
Alice – vocals

Additional musicians
Hiroomi Shitara – guitar
Atsushi Yuasa – bass guitar

Production
Daisuke Katsurada – executive producer
Chiemi Kominami – executive producer
Shunsuke Muramatsu – executive producer
Ken'ichi Nakata – executive producer
Tadayuki Kominami – producer
Dai Ishikawa – director
Takashi Koiwa – mixer
Yuji Chinone – mastering
Shinobu Matsuoka – management
Megumi Hirose – products coordination
Tatsuo Murai – art direction, design

References

2014 albums
ClariS albums
Japanese-language albums
Sony Music albums